Sunnybrae is a small community in the Canadian province of Nova Scotia, located in  Pictou County.

Sanctuaries
Sunnybrae Game Sanctuary

References
Sunnybrae on Destination Nova Scotia
View Of Sunny Brae, Pictou County 1900

Communities in Pictou County
General Service Areas in Nova Scotia